Federalist Party or Federal Party refer to political parties that advocated federalism in the Philippines. Before the recognition of Philippine independence in 1946, several iterations advocated the annexation of the Philippines as a U.S. state through Federalist Party.

Prior to the 2016 general elections, the PDP–Laban initiated moves to revise the 1987 Philippine Constitution and field then Davao City Mayor Rodrigo Duterte to promote the proposal to shift to a federal form of government. This led interest from various groups to convince Duterte to run for president.  When Duterte became the 16th President of the Philippines in 2016, a separate pro-Duterte group launched a new federalist party through Partido Federal ng Pilipinas (PFP).

Insular government era (1900–1907)

After the cessation of hostilities in the Philippine–American War (then known as the "Philippine Insurrection"), political parties were allowed to be formed for the first time. The Partido Federalista (Federal Party) was one of the first to be formed, on December 23, 1900. In the establishment of the Philippine Assembly, delegates such as Pedro Paterno, that pushed for Philippine statehood within the United States, formed the Partido Federal; the party was favored by the American insular government, which appointed delegates in the assembly. The Federalists elected Trinidad Pardo de Tavera as party president and dominated Manila politics. Their primary opponent were delegates that advocated immediate independence; these would later form the Nacionalista Party. The nationalists would wrest control of the assembly starting in 1907 when the first elections were held. At this point, the power of the Federalists waned, and their statehood platform was rescinded, and the party was named as the Progresista Party.

Third Republic (1953–1961) 
A "Federal Party" existed during the Third Philippine Republic. Alfredo Abcede was a two-time presidential candidate of this Federal Party. In 1957, Abcede lost, winning 470 votes nationally or less than 0.01%. In 1961, he lost again, polling a mere seven votes. Abcede also ran for the Senate in 1953, 1955 and 1959, losing each time, and never getting more than 0.5% of the vote.

Fourth Republic (1981) 
Former Representative from Cebu Bartolome Cabangbang was one of the candidates in the 1981 presidential election overwhelmingly won by the incumbent president Ferdinand Marcos.  This election was boycotted by most opposition parties when their preferred candidate, Benigno Aquino Jr., was barred from running for being underage. Cabangbang's platform of the Philippines becoming the 51st state of the United States earned him a surprising 4% of the vote, attributed to the people's yearning for the American colonial administration in preference to Marcos' just-concluded martial law.

Fifth Republic (2018–present) 

On April 30, 2018, a group sympathetic with President Rodrigo Duterte, initiated move to promote federalization of the Philippines as Partido Federal ng Pilipinas (PFP). On June 25, 2018, Lawyer Jesus "Jayvee" Hinlo  was elected as president, former generals Abubakar Mangelen as Chairman and Thompson Lantion as secretary general and the new group filed for accreditation as a political party. The Commission on Elections accredited the party on October 8, 2018.

On October 17, 2018, the party fielded three senatorial candidates in the 2019 midterm election namely Maria Socorro Manahan, Elmer Francisco, and Diosdado Padilla. It also fielded candidates in the local elections as well.

Notes

References

Political parties established in 1900
Defunct political parties in the Philippines
1900 establishments in the Philippines